The canton of Aveyron-Lère is an administrative division of the Tarn-et-Garonne department, in southern France. It was created at the French canton reorganisation which came into effect in March 2015. Its seat is in Caussade.

It consists of the following communes:

Bioule 
Caussade
Montricoux
Nègrepelisse
Saint-Étienne-de-Tulmont
Vaïssac

References

Cantons of Tarn-et-Garonne